Trigonodactylus sharqiyahensis is a gecko of the genus Trigonodactylus that is endemic to Oman.

References

Trigonodactylus
Reptiles described in 2013